PlayStation Network (PSN) is a digital media entertainment service provided by Sony Interactive Entertainment. Launched in November 2006, PSN was originally conceived for the PlayStation video game consoles, but soon extended to encompass smartphones, tablets, Blu-ray players and high-definition televisions. This service is the account for PlayStation consoles, accounts can store games and other content.

As of April 2016, over 110 million users have been documented, with 106 million of them active monthly as of the end of March 2022.
PlayStation Network's services are dedicated to an online marketplace (PlayStation Store), a premium subscription service for enhanced gaming and social features (PlayStation Plus), music streaming (PlayStation Music, based on Spotify) and formerly a cloud gaming service (PlayStation Now; folded into PlayStation Plus Premium in June 2022). The service is available in 73 territories.

History
Launched in the year 2000, Sony's second home console, the PlayStation 2, had rudimentary online features in select games via its online network. It required a network adaptor, which was available as an add-on for original models and integrated into the hardware on slimline models. However, Sony provided no unified service for the system, so support for network features was specific to each game and third-party server, and there was no interoperability of cross-game presence. Five years later during the development stage for its third home console, the PlayStation 3, Sony expressed their intent to build upon the functionality of its predecessor by creating a new interconnected service that keeps users constantly in touch with a "PlayStation World" network. In March 2006, Sony officially introduced its unified online service, tentatively named "PlayStation Network Platform". A list of supporting features was announced at the Tokyo Game Show later the same year.

Sony launched an optional premium subscription service on top of the free PSN service in June 2010. Known as PlayStation Plus, the system provides access to exclusive content, complementary games, regular store discounts, and early access to forthcoming games.

Following a security intrusion, the PlayStation Network had a temporary suspension of operation which began on April 20, 2011 and affected 77 million registered accounts. Lasting 23 days, this outage was the longest amount of time the PSN had been offline since its inception in 2006. Sony reported that user data had been obtained during the intrusion. In June 2011, Sony launched a "Welcome Back" program following the outage, allowing all PSN subscribers who joined prior to April 20 to download two free PlayStation 3 titles and two free PlayStation Portable games. Users also received 30 free days of PlayStation Plus, while users who were already subscribed before the outage got 60 free days. After the disruption, Sony changed the PlayStation Network's license agreement to legally bar users from filing lawsuits and joining class action lawsuits without first trying to resolve issues with an arbitrator.

In July 2012, Sony Computer Entertainment announced that they had acquired video game streaming service Gaikai for $380 million. The acquisition was later strengthened when Sony acquired the assets of Gaikai's market rival OnLive. At the Consumer Electronics Show in January 2014, Sony announced that Gaikai's technology would be used to power PlayStation Now; a new cloud-based gaming service that allows people to play PlayStation games on a variety of devices. During 2014, Sony rolled out the service in North America on PlayStation 3 and PlayStation 4 in beta form as a means for users to test performance and pricing structures.

On December 25, 2014, PlayStation Network and Xbox Live suffered network disruption after a denial-of-service attack. Both services were flooded with millions of inauthentic connection requests, making it hard for genuine users to establish a connection. Functionality was restored on December 26, with some users experiencing difficulties in the days that followed. On January 1, 2015, Sony announced that users would be compensated for the downtime with a five-day extension to PlayStation Plus memberships.

Formerly the gaming provision of the much broader Sony Entertainment Network, the PlayStation Network became Sony's premier entertainment service in 2015, unifying games, music, television and video. While synonymous with gaming, Sony said the PlayStation Network had evolved to become a "comprehensive digital entertainment brand". The SEN name is still used in some places.

User information
Signing up to the PlayStation Network is free. Two types of accounts can be created: Master accounts and Sub accounts. A master account allows full access to all settings, including parental controls. Sub accounts can subsequently be created (e.g. for children) with desired restrictions set by the master account holder. A sub account holder has the option to upgrade their account once they reach 18 years of age. Sony encourage registrants to use a unique email and strong password not associated with other online services.

Online ID
An Online ID is one's username on the PlayStation Network. It can range from 3 to 16 characters in length and consist of letters, numbers, hyphens and underscores. A user's Online ID is central to your PSN profile and is displayed when playing online games and using other network features. In April 2019, Sony enabled users to change their online PSN ID.

Users have the option to disclose their real name aside their Online ID, add a personal description, exhibit a profile picture or avatar, and list all spoken languages. Profiles also include a summary of a player's Trophy level and recent activity. Profiles  can be viewed via the user interface or online through the PlayStation website.

A Portable ID is a small infographic intended for use as a forum signature. The graphic showcases a user's trophy level and number of trophies awarded. Each user is able to log into their PSN account using a web browser to access and customize their Portable ID, and are then given a unique URL which they can cut & paste to display their ID elsewhere on the internet. Several third-party websites offer similar graphics  as both free and paid services which either update automatically or are updated manually by the user.

Trophies
Trophies are in-game awards presented to gamers for hitting specific targets or reaching certain milestones, such as completing a difficult level or defeating a certain number of enemies. There are four different types of trophy awarded: a bronze, silver, or gold trophy is contingent upon the difficulty of the accomplishment, with each reward contributing to a level system attached to a player's profile. A platinum trophy is awarded to the player once they unlock all other trophies in the base game; smaller sized games, however, generally do not offer a platinum trophy. In addition, each trophy is graded by popularity—common, rare, very rare, and ultra rare—based on the percentage of people who have unlocked it. Developers can choose to make various trophies hidden so that their value and description are not revealed until after the user has obtained them.

In an effort to discourage cheating in terms of how soon Trophies are awarded, the PlayStation Network requires consoles to maintain an accurate time and date setting before a digitally downloaded game can be started, which also extends to virtually all physically released software for the PS4 and certain physical games for the PS5.  Without a connection to PlayStation Network, consoles would rely on a CMOS battery to maintain the date and time.  If a console is unable to obtain an accurate date and time from PlayStation Network due to loss of connectivity and CMOS battery charge combined, games can be rendered unplayable on it, leading critics to decry this anti-cheat system as a form of always-on DRM and a threat to video game preservation upon discovery of this issue, known as the C-bomb, several months after the PlayStation 5's launch, as Sony was contemplating an equally controversial decision to shut down the PlayStation Store for previously discontinued systems that used it.  In late September 2021, Sony resolved the C-bomb issue for the PS4 with firmware update 9.0.0, so that an inability to obtain an accurate date and time from PSN would only disable time-stamping of Trophies instead of blocking startup of games.  Sony later resolved the same issue for the PlayStation 5 in November, allowing all physical and digital PS4 and PS5 games to run without any need for an accurate date and time reading from PSN, except for PlayStation Plus games, which require online verification to access them.

PlayStation Plus

PlayStation Plus (PS Plus) is a paid tiered subscription service that provides users with access to premium features. These features include access to online multiplayer, exclusive discounts on the PlayStation Store, the ability to upload up to 100 GB of saved game files to PlayStation servers, and three games available to download each month at no additional cost. These features are available to all subscribers, and are included even at the base "Essential" tier. The "Extra" tier provides access to the PlayStation Plus Collection, as well as a wide catalogue of 400+ PlayStation 4 and PlayStation 5 games. Moreover, the "Extra" tier also unlocks a catalogue of Ubisoft+ classics. The "Premium" (also known as "Deluxe") tier adds access to downloadable PlayStation, PlayStation 2, and PlayStation Portable games, access to limited trials of select games, and (in some regions) the ability to cloud stream certain PlayStation, PS2, PS4, and PSP games. For all tiers of subscription, users can choose between monthly, quarterly, or annual payment.

Furthermore, all PS Plus tiers have the Game Help feature; a PlayStation 5 exclusive that provides spoiler-free hints and tips while playing supported games. Game Help can range from a nudge in the right direction, to a full video walkthrough which can be pinned to the side of the screen to refer to while playing.

Monthly games
Membership includes access to a rotating selection of games, with the selection varying based on PlayStation Store region. New titles are announced every month, to be downloaded immediately or added to a library for later access, before being replaced by a new selection of games. Members can keep all games in their library as long as they remain a member of PlayStation Plus. If their membership lapses, these games will become inaccessible. Once membership is renewed, the games will become unlocked again. In late June 2020, it was announced that PS Plus will expand its capacity of accessible games from two to three for its 10th anniversary.

PlayStation Plus Collection 
In September 2020, Sony announced during its next-generation showcase that PlayStation Plus members who purchase a PlayStation 5 would also get access to a collection of "generation defining" games from the PlayStation 4. The PlayStation Plus collection includes:

 Batman: Arkham Knight
 Battlefield 1
 Bloodborne
 Call of Duty: Black Ops III – Zombies Chronicles Edition
 Crash Bandicoot N. Sane Trilogy
 Detroit: Become Human
 Days Gone

 Fallout 4
 Final Fantasy XV Royal Edition God of War Infamous Second Son The Last Guardian The Last of Us Remastered Monster Hunter: World Mortal Kombat X Persona 5 (Removed May 2022) 
 Ratchet & Clank Resident Evil 7: Biohazard Uncharted 4: A Thief's End Until Dawn 2022 revamp 
On December 3, 2021, Bloomberg reported that Sony was working on a new subscription service codenamed "Spartacus" that would be a merger of the company’s current services, PlayStation Plus and PlayStation Now, with the company reportedly set to keep the Plus branding. The service was reported as including three tiers, the first including all the benefits of PlayStation Plus, the second expanding upon the first by including a catalog of PlayStation 4 and PlayStation 5 titles, and the third expanding upon the first two by including demos as well as a catalog of games from the PlayStation, PlayStation 2, PlayStation 3, and PlayStation Portable.  Bloomberg claimed the service would launch within early 2022 and compete with Microsoft’s Xbox Game Pass service.

The revamped PlayStation Plus service with a three-tier subscription model was officially confirmed by Sony in March 2022 as launching in June 2022; the new service launched first in Asian territories excluding Japan on May 23, 2022, in Japan on June 1, 2022, in North America on June 13, 2022, and in Europe on June 22, 2022. The existing service became PlayStation Plus Essential, PlayStation Plus Extra additionally gives the user access up to 400 PS4 and PS5 games as downloadable and streamable titles, and PlayStation Plus Premium further adds access to streaming of up to 340 games from the PlayStation, PS2, PS3, and PSP and download of all but the PS3 games. For markets without cloud streaming, Sony offers an alternate version of Premium called PlayStation Plus Deluxe that includes the benefits of Premium at a discounted rate without cloud streaming.

 Sony PlayStation Plus Membership Plans 

 PlayStation Store 

The PlayStation Store is a digital media shop that offers a range of downloadable content both for purchase and available free of charge. This includes full games, free-to-play games, add-ons, demos, music, movies and background themes. The store accepts physical currency, PayPal transfers and prepaid network cards.

PlayStation Network Cards are a form of electronic money that can be used with the PlayStation Store. Each card contains an alphanumeric code which can be entered on the PlayStation Network to deposit credit in a virtual wallet. Sony devised the payment method for people without access to a credit card, and PlayStation owners who would like to send or receive such cards as gifts. The tickets are available via online retailers, convenience stores, electronic kiosks and post office ATMs.

In 2012 Sony introduced a cross-buy initiative whereby a game available for multiple PlayStation devices need only be purchased once. Players who download the PlayStation 3 version of a game can transfer to the PlayStation Vita or PlayStation 4 version at no extra cost, and vice versa. Users have immediate access to supported titles in their digital game library, even when they upgrade to the newest system. The initiative was later extended to include PlayStation 5.

PlayStation Blog

The PlayStation Blog is an online PlayStation focused gaming blog which is part of the PlayStation Network. Launched in June 2007, regular content includes game announcements, developer interviews and store updates. A sub-site of the blog called PlayStation.Blog Share was launched in March 2010 and allows PSN users to submit ideas to the PlayStation team about anything PlayStation-related as well as vote on the ideas of other submissions.

Original programming
Beginning in the spring of 2015, PlayStation Network began to produce and distribute their own original content. The first original scripted program, Powers'', premiered on March 10, 2015 and ran for two full seasons. The series was cancelled on August 3, 2016.

In June 2017, it was announced that Sony was launching the Emerging Filmmakers Program where members of the public can submit pitches for potential television series to be aired on PlayStation Network. Submissions were due on August 1, 2017 and five of the ideas would be turned into pilot episodes that will be voted on by the PlayStation community.

See also 
List of PlayStation applications
Nintendo Switch Online
Xbox network

Notes

References

External links 

 
Computer-related introductions in 2006
Multiplayer video game services
Online video game services
Network
Network
PlayStation (brand)
Network
 
PlayStation Vita
Sony services